The Supercopa 2008 was disputed in the Pabellón Príncipe Felipe, Zaragoza. The teams that took part in the tournament were:

CAI Zaragoza - host team
TAU Cerámica - 2007/2008 Liga ACB champions
DKV Joventut - 2007/2008 Copa del Rey de Baloncesto champions
Regal FC Barcelona - Runner-up in the ACB League Play-Off 2007/2008

Semifinals

Final

See also
 Supercopa de España de Baloncesto
 ACB

External links
 Official website

Supercopa de España de Baloncesto
2008–09 in Spanish basketball cups